The Ghost of Twisted Oaks is the American silent film produced by Sid Films and distributed by Lubin Manufacturing Company. It was directed by Sidney Olcott with Valentine Grant and Florence Walcott in leading roles.

Cast
 Valentine Grant - Mary Randall
 Florence Walcott - Her Mother
 James Vincent - Jack Carlton
 Arthur Donaldson -

Production notes
The film was shot in Jacksonville, Florida.

External links

 The Ghost of Twisted Oaks at website dedicated to Sidney Olcott

1915 films
Silent American drama films
American silent short films
Films directed by Sidney Olcott
1915 short films
1915 drama films
American black-and-white films
1910s American films